The Chautang is a seasonal river, originating in the Sivalik Hills, in the Indian state of Haryana. The Chautang River is a tributary of the Sarsuti river which in turn is a tributary of the Ghaggar river.

Origin and route
The Chautang river is a seasonal river in the state of Haryana, India. It is theorized by some to be a remnant of the ancient river Drishadvati. It joins the Ghaggar-Hakra River east of Suratgarh in Rajasthan. According to McIntosh, this river was one of the main contributors to this river system until the Yamuna changed its course. However, according to Giosan, the Chautang is a rain-fed river, and the Yamuna changed its course towards east some 50,000 to 10,000 years ago, and didn't pour any water into it for the last 10,000 years. Hansi Branch of Western Yamuna Canal is palaeochannel of this river.

Firuz Tughluq ( A.D. 1351-1388) did not do what his predecessors had done. He reduced land revenue, exempted the peasants of several taxes and providing them many facilities. He took out a canal from the Yamuna which entered the district at Anta (tahsil Safidon) and thence flowing through the present Jind District from east to west in the line of the old Chautang river passing the town of Safidon, Dhatrath and Jind and reached Hisar. This branch was built in the paleochannel of seasonal Chautang river which is a relict of Drishadvati river flowing from Kaithal to Hisar district, passing through the towns of Jind, Hansi, Hisar, largest Indus Valley civilization site of Rakhigarhi and ancient Agroha Mound. Drishadvati river itself was a tributary of the Ghaggar-Hakra River.

See also 

 Western Yamuna Canal, branches off Yamuna river
 Markanda river, a tributary of Sarsuti
 Dangri, a tributary of Sarsuti
 Sarsuti, a tributary of Ghaggar-Hakra River
 Kaushalya river, a tributary of Ghaggar-Hakra River
 Sutlej, a tributary of Indus
 Ganges
 Indus

References

External links 
Sarasvati-Sindhu civilization and Sarasvati River 
The Saraswati: Where lies the mystery by Saswati Paik

Rivers of Himachal Pradesh
Rivers of Haryana
Rivers of Punjab, India
Rigvedic rivers
Indus basin
International rivers of Asia
Sarasvati River
Rivers of India